All chicken breeds recognized by the American Poultry Association are categorized into classes. Standard-sized breeds are grouped by type or by place of origin; bantam breeds are classified according to type or physical characteristics.

Large breeds
The large breeds are divided into six classes – American, Asiatic, Continental, English, Mediterranean, and All Other Standard Breeds – largely according to their place of origin.

American 

The American Class contains thirteen breeds which originated in Canada or the United States. All are heavy breeds, and most lay brown eggs; most are cold-hardy:

Buckeye
Chantecler
Delaware
Dominique
Holland
Java
Jersey Giant
Lamona
New Hampshire
Plymouth Rock
Rhode Island Red
Rhode Island White
Wyandotte

Asiatic 

These three breeds originate in China; they are large, feather legged, and lay brown eggs:

 Brahma
 Cochin
 Langshan

Continental 

This group consists of eleven breeds from Belgium, France, Germany, and the Netherlands. They are mostly sprightly birds, the Faverolles being an exception:

 Barnevelder
 Campine
 Crevecoeur
 Faverolles
 Hamburg
 Houdan
 La Fleche
 Lakenvelder
 Marans
 Polish
 Welsummer

English 

This class consists of five breeds from the United Kingdom and one from Australia:

 Australorp
 Cornish
 Dorking
 Orpington
 Redcap
 Sussex

Mediterranean 

These breeds originating in Italy and Spain have white earlobes and tend to be productive layers of white eggs. In general they are flighty, and exceptional free-range birds, with both evasion and foraging skills:

Ancona
Andalusian
Catalana
Leghorn
Minorca
Sicilian Buttercup
White-faced Black Spanish

All Other Standard Breeds 

Other breeds are grouped in this class, which has three subclasses: Game, Oriental, and Miscellaneous. The Game subclass includes the non-oriental game birds, the Oriental subclass includes mainly birds from Asia; the Cubalaya, however, is from Cuba. The Miscellaneous subclass holds the remaining breeds.

Game 

 Modern Game
 Old English Game
 American Game

Oriental 

 Aseel
 Cubalaya
 Malay
 Phoenix
 Shamo
 Sumatra
 Yokohama

Miscellaneous 

 Ameraucana
 Araucana
 Naked-neck
 Sultan

Bantam breeds
Bantams are grouped according to type or physical appearance into six classes: Modern Game; Game; Single Comb Clean Legged; Rose Comb Clean Legged; Feather Legged; and All Other Comb Clean Legged. The American Bantam Association classifications may be different.

Modern Game 

This class consists solely of the Modern Game bantam.

Game 

The Game class includes the remaining game bantams:

 American Game
 Old English Game

Single Comb Clean Legged

This class contains all the bantam breeds with a single comb, excluding the game bantams:

 Ancona (single comb)
 Andalusian
 Australorp
 Campine
 Catalana
 Delaware
 Dorking (single comb)
 Dutch
 Holland
 Japanese
 Java
 Jersey Giant
 Lakenvelder
 Lamona
 Leghorn (single comb)
 Minorca (single comb)
 Naked-neck chicken
 Nankin (single comb)
 New Hampshire
 Orpington
 Phoenix
 Plymouth Rock
 Rhode Island Red
 Serama
 Spanish
 Sussex
 Welsummer

Rose Comb Clean Legged 

This class groups breeds with both a rose comb and featherless legs:

 Ancona (rose comb)
 Bearded d'Anvers
 Dominique
 Dorking (rose comb)
 Hamburg
 Leghorn (rose comb)
 Minorca (rose comb)
 Nankin (rose comb)
 Redcap
 Rhode Island Red
 Rhode Island White
 Rosecomb
 Sebright
 Wyandotte

Feather Legged

The breeds of this class have feathering on their legs and feet:

 Belgian Bearded d'Uccle
 Booted
 Brahma
 Cochin
 Faverolles
 Langshan (Croad Langshan)
 Silkie
 Sultan

All Other Comb Clean Legged

This class includes all of the breeds that do not fall into any of the other classes:

 Ameraucana
 Araucana
 Buckeye
 Chantecler
 Cornish
 Crevecoeur
 Cubalaya
 Houdan
 La Fleche
 Malay
 Polish
 Shamo
 Sicilian Buttercup
 Sumatra
 Yokohama

See also

 American Standard of Perfection
 List of chicken breeds

References 

Poultry farming in the United States